House at 207 Carpenter Avenue is a historic home located at Sea Cliff in Nassau County, New York.  It was built about 1885 and is a -story clapboard-sided house with a multi-gabled slate roof in the Queen Anne style.  It features an attached tower with tent roof and a porte cochere with bell shaped roof. The porte cochere has a second floor sleeping porch with decorative balustrade.

It was listed on the National Register of Historic Places in 1988.

References

Houses on the National Register of Historic Places in New York (state)
Queen Anne architecture in New York (state)
Houses completed in 1885
Houses in Nassau County, New York
National Register of Historic Places in Nassau County, New York